Explorer is a 2022 biographical documentary film about the life and exploits of British explorer Sir Ranulph Fiennes, directed by Matthew Dyas.

Synopsis
The film includes both contemporary and archive footage and covers many of aspects of Fiennes' life including self-amputation of his fingers due to frostbite, involvement in the Dhofar Rebellion, leading the Transglobe expedition, being booted out of the SAS, running 7 marathons on 7 days on 7 continents, auditioning for James Bond, and reflections on his personal and family life.

Cast
Ranulph Fiennes as himself
Anton Bowring as himself
HM King Charles III as himself

Release

Box office
Explorer was released to theatres on July 14, 2022.  It was released to video on August 30, 2022.

Critical reception
The film holds a metacritic score of 81 denoting reviews as "universal acclaim" which includes a 3 star review by Cath Clarke for the Guardian and a 5 star review by Robbie Collin for the Telegraph.

Empire contributor Ian Freer gave a 4 star rating, writing "If it adds little in the way of dissenting voices or a different viewpoint, Explorer tells the tale of a remarkable, stranger-than-fiction life and emerges as an affecting, entertaining portrait of a true eccentric".  Nell Minow for RogerEbert.com gave the film a 3.5 star rating writing that the "organization of the film is distracting" however the subject is "never less than enthralling".

References 

Biographical documentary films
Polar exploration
2022 documentary films
British documentary films